Flag of Groningen may refer to:

Flag of Groningen
Flag of Groningen (province)